Parapercis moki, or Mok's sandperch, is a fish species in the sandperch family, Pinguipedidae. It is found in Taiwan. This species can reach a length of  TL.

Etymology
The fish is named in honor of ichthyologist Hin-Kiu Mok (b. 1947) of the National Sun Ye-San University in Taiwan.

References

Pinguipedidae
Taxa named by Hans Hsuan-Ching Ho
Taxa named by Jeffrey W. Johnson
Fish described in 2013